A - B - C - D - E - F - G - H - I - J - K - L - M - N - O - P - Q - R - S - T - U - V - W - XYZ

This is a list of rivers in the United States that have names starting with the letter M.  For the main page, which includes links to listings by state, see List of rivers in the United States.

Ma 
Macatawa River - Michigan
Machias River - Eastern Maine
Machias River (Aroostook River) - Northern Maine
Mackinaw River - Illinois
Macoupin Creek - Illinois
Mad River - California
Mad River - Maine
Mad River - Eastern New Hampshire
Mad River - Central New Hampshire
Mad River - Ohio
Mad River - Vermont
Mad River - Washington
Madison River - Wyoming, Montana
Magalloway River - Maine, New Hampshire
Magothy River - Maryland
Mahoning River - Ohio, Pennsylvania
Maidford River - Rhode Island
Maiford River - Rhode Island
Malad River - Idaho
Malad River - Idaho and Utah
Malden River - Massachusetts
Malheur River - Oregon
Manasquan River - New Jersey
Manatee River - Florida
Manhan River - Massachusetts
Manistee River - Michigan
Manistique River - Michigan
Manitowish River - Wisconsin
Manitowoc River - Wisconsin
Manumuskin River - New Jersey
Mapes Creek - Washington
Maple River - Iowa
Maple River - Minnesota
Maple River - North Dakota
Maquoketa River - Iowa
Marais des Cygnes River - Kansas, Missouri
Marengo River - Wisconsin
Marias River - Montana
Marion River - New York
Marmaton River - Kansas, Missouri
Martin River - Alaska
Marys River - Illinois
Marys River - Oregon
Mascoma River - New Hampshire
Mashpee River - Massachusetts
Maskerchugg River - Rhode Island
Mat River - Virginia
Matanuska River - Alaska
Matanzas River - Florida
Matfield River - Massachusetts
Matta River - Virginia
Mattapoisett River - Massachusetts
Mattaponi River - Virginia
Mattatuxet River - Rhode Island
Mattole River - California
Maumee River - Indiana, Ohio
Maunesha River - Wisconsin
Maurice River - New Jersey
Maury River - Virginia
Mayo River - Virginia, North Carolina
Mazon River - Illinois

Mc 
McCloud River - California
McElroy Creek - West Virginia
McKenzie River - Oregon
McKim Creek - West Virginia
McNeil River - Alaska

Me 
Meade River - Alaska
Meadow River - West Virginia
Meadow Valley Wash - Nevada
Meathouse Fork - West Virginia
Mecan River - Wisconsin
Mechums River - Virginia
Medicine Bow River - Colorado, Wyoming
Medicine Lodge River - Kansas, Oklahoma
Medina River - Texas
Meduxnekeag River - Maine
Meeme River - Wisconsin
Meherrin River - Virginia, North Carolina
Melozitna River - Alaska
Melvin River - New Hampshire
Mendenhall River - Alaska
Menominee River - Michigan, Wisconsin
Menominee River - Wisconsin, Illinois
Menomonee River - Wisconsin
Meramec River - Missouri
Merced River - California
Merrimack River - Massachusetts, New Hampshire
Merrymeeting River - New Hampshire
Meshik River - Alaska
Metedeconk River - New Jersey
Methow River - Washington
Metolius River - Oregon
Mettawee River - Vermont, New York

Mi 
Miami River - Florida
Miami River - New York
Miami River - Oregon
Mianus River - Connecticut, New York
Michigan River - Colorado
Middle Branch Piscataquog River - New Hampshire
Middle River - Iowa
Middle River - Minnesota
Middle River - Wisconsin
Middle Fork River - West Virginia
Middle Fork John Day River - Oregon
Middle Fork Kentucky River - Kentucky
Middle Fork Salmon River - Idaho
Middle Fork South Platte River - California
Middle Fork Vermilion River - Illinois
Middle Fork Willamette River - Oregon
Middle Island Creek - West Virginia
Middle Santiam River - Oregon
Miles River - Maryland
Milk River (Alberta–Montana) - Montana
Mill Creek - southern California
Mill Creek - Tehama County, California
Mill Creek - Ohio
Mill Creek - West Virginia
Mill River - Connecticut
Mill River (Northampton, Massachusetts) - western Massachusetts
Mill River (Massachusetts – Rhode Island) - Massachusetts, Rhode Island
Mill River (Taunton River) - southeastern Massachusetts
Millers River - New Hampshire, Massachusetts
Millers River - Rhode Island
Mills River - North Carolina
Millstone River - New Jersey
Milwaukee River - Wisconsin
Mimbres River - New Mexico
Minam River - Oregon
Mineral River - Michigan
Mink River - Wisconsin
Minnehaha Creek - Minnesota
Minnesota River - Minnesota
Mishnock River - Rhode Island
Mispillion River - Delaware
Mission River - Texas
Missisquoi River - Vermont
Mississinewa River - Indiana
Mississippi River - Minnesota, Wisconsin, Iowa, Illinois, Missouri, Kentucky, Tennessee, Arkansas, Mississippi, Louisiana
Missouri River - Montana, North Dakota, South Dakota, Nebraska, Iowa, Kansas, Missouri
Misteguay Creek - Michigan
Mitchell River - Massachusetts
Mitchell River - North Carolina
Mitchigan River - Michigan

Mo 
Mobile River - Alabama
Mohawk River - New Hampshire
Mohawk River - New York
Mohawk River - Oregon
Mohican River - Ohio
Mohlendorph Creek - Washington
Mojave River - California
Mokelumne River - California
Molalla River - Oregon
Monatiquot River - Massachusetts
Monday Creek - Ohio
Monocacy River - Maryland
Monongahela River - West Virginia, Pennsylvania
Montello River - Wisconsin
Montreal River - Michigan Keweenaw Peninsula
Montreal River - Michigan-Wisconsin border
Moormans River - Virginia
Moose River - New Hampshire
Moose River - New York
Moose River - Wisconsin
Moosup River - Rhode Island, Connecticut
Moreau River - South Dakota
Moshassuck River - Rhode Island
Mosquito Creek - Iowa
Moswansicut River - Rhode Island
Mount Hope River - Connecticut
Mountain Fork - Arkansas, Oklahoma
Mousam River - Maine
Mowich River - Washington
Moxahala Creek - Ohio
Moyie River - Idaho, British Columbia

Mu 
Muckalee Creek - Georgia
Mud River - Kentucky
Mud River - West Virginia
Muddy Creek - Colorado
Muddy Creek - Utah
Muddy River - Nevada
Mukwonago River - Wisconsin
Mulberry Creek - Alabama
Mulberry Fork of the Black Warrior River - Alabama
Mulberry River - Arkansas
Mulchatna River - Alaska
Mullet River - Wisconsin
Mullica River - New Jersey
Mumford River - Massachusetts
Muncy Creek - Pennsylvania
Murderkill River - Delaware
Muscatatuck River - Indiana
Musconetcong River - New Jersey
Muskegon River - Michigan
Muskingum River - Ohio
Musselshell River - Montana
Mustinka River - Minnesota

My 
Myakka River - Florida
Mystic River - Connecticut
Mystic River - Massachusetts

M